Anastase Shyaka is an academic and politician in Rwanda, who has served as the Minister of Local government, in the cabinet of Rwanda, since 18 October 2018.

Before his current appointment, he was the chief executive officer of Rwanda Governance Board. He also served in the past as the Director, Center for Conflict Management at the National University of Rwanda. Now he has been appointed as a personal adviser of two western Province districts i.e. District of Nyamasheke and Rusizi which some sources confirm that it is his native area.

See also
 Parliament of Rwanda
 Prime Minister of Rwanda

References

External links
Website of Rwanda Ministry of Local Government (Minaloc) 
Out goes the Old Guard: New faces and experience in Kagame’s government As of 20 October 2018.
Q&A: Rwanda’s governance and democratic path working – Prof. Shyaka As of 24 June 2012.

Living people
Rwandan politicians
21st-century Rwandan politicians
Government ministers of Rwanda
Members of the Parliament of Rwanda
Academic staff of the National University of Rwanda
1968 births